"Ka Mate" is a Māori haka composed by Te Rauparaha, war leader of the Ngāti Toa tribe of the North Island of New Zealand.

Composition
Te Rauparaha composed "Ka Mate" circa 1820 as a celebration of life over death after his lucky escape from pursuing Ngāti Maniapoto and Waikato enemies. He had hidden from them in a pātaka, a food-storage pit, and climbed back into the light to be met by a chief friendly to him – Te Wharerangi (the "hairy man").

The haka as composed by Te Rauparaha begins with a chant:

Then follows the main body of the haka:

"Ka Mate" was conceived as a brief energizing haka of the ngeri type, where, in the absence of set movements, the performers are free to extemporize their chanting and movement as they feel fit, without any need for synchronization.

Use in rugby

"Ka Mate" is the most widely known haka in New Zealand and internationally because a choreographed and synchronized version of the chant has traditionally been performed by the All Blacks, New Zealand's international rugby union team, as well as the Kiwis, New Zealand's international rugby league team, immediately prior to test (international) matches. Since 2005 the All Blacks have occasionally performed another haka, "Kapa o Pango". Since the introduction of "Kapa o Pango" the longest sequence of "Ka Mate" performances by the All Blacks is nine, which occurred between 22 August 2009 and 12 June 2010.

In an interview with ESPN shortly before the 2019 Rugby World Cup, All Blacks scrum-half TJ Perenara, the team's designated haka leader at the time and a Māori who was raised in the region where Te Rauparaha lived, explained the process of selecting which haka will be performed before a given match:

Ownership

Between 1998 and 2006, Ngāti Toa attempted to trademark "Ka Mate" to prevent its use by commercial organisations without their permission. In 2006, the Intellectual Property Office of New Zealand declined their claim on the grounds that "Ka Mate" had achieved wide recognition in New Zealand and abroad as representing New Zealand as a whole and not a particular trader. In March 2011, New Zealand Rugby Union came to an amicable agreement with the iwi not to bring the mana of the haka into disrepute.

In 2009, as a part of a wider settlement of grievances, the New Zealand government agreed to:
"...record the authorship and significance of the haka Ka Mate to Ngāti Toa and ... work with Ngāti Toa to address their concerns with the haka... [but] does not expect that redress will result in royalties for the use of Ka Mate or provide Ngāti Toa with a veto on the performance of Ka Mate...".

However, a survey of nineteenth-century New Zealand newspapers found Ka Mate was used by tribes from other parts of New Zealand, and was generally described by them as being an ancient peacekeeping song, from eras long before its appropriation by the Ngāti Toa chief Te Rauparaha. When Ngāti Toa authorities were asked for evidence that Ka Mate was of Ngāti Toa authorship, they were unable to provide any.

In popular culture 
In 2021, Glenn Osbourne turned the body of the haka into a ballad in C major.

See also

 Haka (sports)
 Haka in popular culture
 Kapa haka
 Māori music

References

External links

The story behind "Ka Mate" – includes a recording
Another and different translation of haka – tells the meaning behind the translation
Ancient versions of Ka Mate – A comparative study of "Ka Mate" from ten different sources.

1820s poems
Ritual dances
Māori culture
Haka
New Zealand poetry
Rugby football culture
Māori-language songs